The 1972 Cincinnati Reds season consisted of the Reds winning the National League West title with a record of 95 wins and 59 losses, 10½ games over the Houston Astros and the Los Angeles Dodgers. They defeated the previous year's World Series Champion Pittsburgh Pirates in the 1972 National League Championship Series, but lost to the Oakland Athletics in seven games in the 1972 World Series. The Reds were managed by Sparky Anderson.

The theme for the Reds was "Redemption" after a disastrous 1971 season that saw the Reds fall from a World Series participant in 1970 to a sub .500 team a year later. In fact, the March 13, 1972, Sports Illustrated edition featured the Reds on the front cover headlining "Redemption for the Reds." The Reds won 102 games in 1970, but only 79 a year later. A major catalyst for the Reds, Bobby Tolan, ruptured his Achilles' tendon in the winter of 1971 while playing basketball and he missed the entire '71 MLB season. Nearly every Reds regular, including Pete Rose, Johnny Bench, Tony Pérez, Bernie Carbo and David Concepcion, had significant decreases in their production from 1970. The lone exception was popular first baseman Lee May, who set career highs in home runs (39) and slugging percentage (.532).

Reds fans, en masse, were shocked and dismayed when, on November 29, 1971, Cincinnati Reds General Manager Bob Howsam traded May, Gold Glove winning second baseman Tommy Helms and key utility man Jimmy Stewart to division rival Houston Astros for second baseman Joe Morgan, third baseman Denis Menke, pitcher Jack Billingham, little-used reserve outfielder Cesar Geronimo and minor leaguer Ed Armbrister. The trade turned out to be one of the best trades in Reds history. Morgan would escape the cavernous Houston Astrodome to a more hitter-friendly Riverfront Stadium home park. Surrounded by more talent in Cincinnati, Morgan would become one of the more productive power-speed players in the entire decade on his way to eventual induction into the Baseball Hall of Fame. Morgan and Geronimo would also go on to each win multiple Gold Glove awards, as Geronimo manned right field until 1974 when he would take over in center field. Billingham would go on to win 12 games in 1972 and 50 total in his first three years with the Reds. Billingham's best moments came in the 1972 World Series when he threw  innings allowing no earned runs in collecting a win, a save, and a no decision in Game 7.

With Rose, Morgan and a healthy Tolan at the top of the lineup, a rejuvenated Bench was the recipient as the Reds' cleanup hitter. Rebounding from the 1971 disaster when he only drove in 61 runs, Bench slammed 40 home runs and had a major league-best 125 RBI. Bench also walked a career-high 100 times on his way to NL MVP honors, his second in three years.

Cincinnati got off to a slow start, winning only eight of their first 21 games before winning nine straight. The Reds were still only 20–18 when they went into Houston to play the retooled Astros for a four-game series, May 29 – June 1, at the Astrodome, a notorious pitchers park. But the Reds scored 39 runs in the series and won all four games. The Reds went into the July 23 All-Star break with a 6½ game lead over the Astros and an 8-game lead over the Dodgers. Neither team seriously threatened the Reds in the second half.

Reds ace Gary Nolan won 13 of his 15 decisions by July 13, only 79 games into the season. But Nolan suffered a series of neck and shoulder ailments that forced him out of the All Star game and limited him to a total of 25 starts. He spent much of the second-half on the disabled list resting and then rehabbing. He won two games after the All-Star break. Nolan still finished second in the National League in ERA (1.99) to Philadelphia's Steve Carlton (1.97). Morgan (122 runs scored, 16 home runs, 73 RBI, 58 stolen bases, .292 average) finished fourth in MVP voting, while Rose (107 runs, 198 hits, 11 triples, .307 avg.) and reliever Clay Carroll (37 saves, 2.25 ERA) were 12th and 13th, respectively, in the MVP voting conducted by the Baseball Writers' Association of America.

The Reds beat the Pittsburgh Pirates, three games to two, in an exciting 1972 National League Championship Series, the first time in its four-year history the NLCS had gone five games. The World Series against the Oakland A's was equally as epic, with the Reds falling in Game 7, 3–2, the sixth game of the series decided by a single run.

Off season 
 November 29, 1971: Lee May, Tommy Helms, and Jimmy Stewart were traded by the Reds to the Houston Astros for Joe Morgan, Ed Armbrister, Jack Billingham, César Gerónimo, and Denis Menke.
 Dec 3, 1971: Wayne Granger was traded by the Reds to the Minnesota Twins for Tom Hall.
 December 14, 1971: Jim Qualls was traded by the Reds to the Chicago White Sox for Pat Jacquez.

Season standings

Record vs. opponents

Notable transactions 
 June 6, 1972: Ron Hassey was drafted by the Reds in the 23rd round of the 1972 Major League Baseball Draft, but did not sign.

Roster

Player stats

Batting

Starters by position 
Note: Pos = Position; G = Games played; AB = At bats; H = Hits; Avg. = Batting average; HR = Home runs; RBI = Runs batted in

Other batters 
Note: G = Games played; AB = At bats; H = Hits; Avg. = Batting average; HR = Home runs; RBI = Runs batted in

Pitching

Starting pitchers 
Note: G = Games pitched; GS = Games started; IP = Innings pitched; W = Wins; L = Losses; ERA = Earned run average; SO = Strikeouts

Other pitchers 
Note: G = Games pitched; IP = Innings pitched; W = Wins; L = Losses; ERA = Earned run average; SO = Strikeouts

Relief pitchers 
Note: G = Games pitched; W = Wins; L = Losses; ERA = Earned run average; SO = Strikeouts; SV = Saves

Postseason

1972 National League Championship Series 

The Reds rallied to defeat the Pittsburgh Pirates in five games to win the National League title. In Game 5, Johnny Bench's ninth-inning home run tied the game before George Foster scored the game-winner on a wild pitch by Pirates' reliever Bob Moose.

Game 1 
October 7: Three Rivers Stadium, Pittsburgh, Pennsylvania

Game 2 
October 8: Three Rivers Stadium, Pittsburgh, Pennsylvania

Game 3 
October 9: Riverfront Stadium, Cincinnati

Game 4 
October 10: Riverfront Stadium, Cincinnati

Game 5 
October 11: Riverfront Stadium, Cincinnati

1972 World Series 

The Reds were a prohibitive favorite to win the World Series over the Oakland Athletics, who lost top slugger Reggie Jackson to a hamstring injury in the playoffs. But Gene Tenace, who hit just five home runs in the regular season, crushed four against the Reds in a series that saw six of the seven games decided by one run. Oakland dealt the Reds three losses on their home AstroTurf of Riverfront Stadium. Tenace had two hits and two RBI in Game 7 as Oakland scored two in the sixth inning and held on for a 3–2 victory for the A's first World Series title since 1930.

Awards and honors 
 Sparky Anderson, Associated Press NL Manager of the Year
 Johnny Bench, National League MVP
 Bobby Tolan, Hutch Award

Farm system 

LEAGUE CHAMPIONS: Melbourne Reds

Notes

References 
1972 Cincinnati Reds season at Baseball Reference

Cincinnati Reds seasons
Cincinnati Reds season
National League champion seasons
National League West champion seasons
Cincinnati